ʻAbd al-Rabb (ALA-LC romanization of ) is a male Muslim given name, and in modern usage, surname. It is built from the Arabic words ʻabd and al-Rabb. The name means "servant of the Lord", a Muslim theophoric name.

Because the letter r is a sun letter, the letter l of the al- is assimilated to it. Thus although the name is written in Arabic with letters corresponding to Abd al-Rab, the usual pronunciation corresponds to Abd ar-Rab. Alternative transliterations include ‘Abd ar-Rabb, Abdul Rab, and others, all subject to variable spacing and hyphenation.

It may refer to:

People with the given name
Abdur Rab Nishtar (1899–1958), Pakistani politician
Abdurabb Al Yazeedi (born 1988), Qatari footballer
Abdur Rab Jaunpuri (1875–1935), Indian Muslim scholar

People with the surname
A. S. M. Abdur Rab (born 1945), Bangladeshi  politician
P. K. Abdu Rabb (born 1948), Kerala politician

References

Arabic masculine given names